Buor-Yuryakh may refer to Sakha rivers:

Buor-Yuryakh, a right tributary of the Alazeya
Buor-Yuryakh (Alazeya Plateau), a left tributary of the Alazeya
Buor-Yuryakh (Chondon), a tributary of the Chondon
Buor-Yuryakh, a tributary of the Khastakh
Buor-Yuryakh (Kuydusun), a tributary of the Kuydusun
Buor-Yuryakh (Selennyakh), a tributary of the Selennyakh
Buor-Yuryakh (Uyandina), a tributary of the Uyandina